Dhar or Dhad is a guerrilla warfare tactic used in Indian history. Maharana Pratap was first Indian king who used guerrilla warfare in organized form. The north Indian Hindu Khaps employed the tactic against invading Muslim armies (such as Mahmud of Ghazni, Timur, Ahmad Shah Abdali) and later by Jats, Rajputs (Maharana Pratap and Rana Sanga), Sikh (Bhangi Misl of Dhillon Jat Sikhs, Guru Gobind Singh and Banda Singh Bahadur) and Marathas against Mughals. Gokula Raja Ram Jat successfully used Dhar guerrilla tactics in the 1680s against Aurangzeb's larger Mughal forces.

References

Military tactics